Lovers and Leavers is the fifth studio album by American singer-songwriter Hayes Carll.

Critical reception
Exclaim! wrote that "the songs themselves are generally uninspired, and often feel unfinished despite being co-written, almost all of them, with top-notch songwriters." Relix wrote that Carll's "hard-bitten tales bring favorable comparisons to Townes Van Zandt, Guy Clark and Kris Kristofferson."

Track listing 
 Drive (Hayes Carll, Jim Lauderdale) – 3:19
 Sake of the Song (Carll, Darrell Scott) – 4:44
 Good While It Lasted (Carll, Will Hoge) – 3:14
 You Leave Alone (Carll, Scott Nolan) – 4:01
 My Friends (Carll, David Beck, Paul Cauthen) – 3:52
 The Love That We Need (Carll, Jack Ingram, Allison Moorer) – 4:08
 Love Don't Let Me Down (Carll, Scott) – 3:16
 The Magic Kid (Carll, Scott) – 4:08
 Love Is So Easy (Carll, Ruston Kelly) – 3:04
 Jealous Moon (Carll, J.D. Souther) – 4:24

Personnel 
 Hayes Carll – Vocals, acoustic guitar
 Jay Bellerose – Drums, percussion
 Tyler Chester – Piano, organ, and Wurlitzer
 Eric Heywood – Pedal steel
 David Piltch – Electric bass, upright bass

References

2016 albums
Hayes Carll albums